Carsten Bruun (born 24 November 1953) is a Danish politician. He is a member of the Venstre party, and was the mayor of Samsø Municipality between 2002 and 2009. He moved to Samsø in 1981. He has been sitting in Samsø Municipality's municipal council since 2002.

References 

1953 births
Living people
Danish municipal councillors
Mayors of places in Denmark
Venstre (Denmark) politicians
People from Rudersdal Municipality